Deister Archeological Site (23PL2) is a historic archaeological site located at Kansas City, Platte County, Missouri.  It is a terrace level village site situated along Line Creek. The pottery and stone tools from the site belong to the technological/artistic tradition that is described as "Hopewell tradition."

It was listed on the National Register of Historic Places in 1970.

References

Archaeological sites on the National Register of Historic Places in Missouri
Buildings and structures in Platte County, Missouri
National Register of Historic Places in Platte County, Missouri